The Norfolk County Football Association is the governing body for football in the county of Norfolk, England.

History and Organisation

Norfolk County Football Association was founded in 1881 and has been administering football in the County, at both grass roots and professional level, for over 120 years.

For most of this time the work has been carried out on an honorary basis, however funding support from The Football Association led to the association becoming administered by a full-time secretariat in 1996.

On 24 August 1999 the association became a limited company, again at the behest of The Football Association. Since then The FA has taken a far greater interest in County Associations, working in partnership to provide increased sums of money to support new initiatives and staffing.

Since becoming a limited company, the structure of the association has changed significantly. The council oversees the implementation of policy through its committee structure in ‘football’ matters, including in the areas of Competitions, Discipline and Referees. The Board of Directors has responsibility for Financial and Commercial matters, whilst the staff at County Headquarters is responsible for implementing the decisions made by the two groups.

The association acquired the leasehold of a purpose built football facility in Bowthorpe, Norwich in 2009 – the site becoming known as the Norfolk County FA Football Development Centre, or 'the FDC'. The Centre is a hub of both regulated and recreational activity for the football community of Norwich and Norfolk, offering a range of small sided and full sizes football facilities. 

The work of the County Football Association is underpinned by an army of volunteers involved within the County's member leagues and clubs. Without their contribution, it would be impossible to organise and run football on the scale it is enjoyed in Norfolk today.

Football Development

Norfolk County FA’s Football Development team works towards improving every aspect of the grassroots game. Their day to day involvement includes:

Developing and assisting local clubs towards the achievement of Charter Standard awards
Developing volunteers through a wide variety of coach, medical and refereeing courses
Developing facilities by working in conjunction with funding bodies such as The Football Foundation
Developing football amongst children through involvement with schools and education programmes

Affiliated Leagues

Men's Saturday Leagues
Anglian Combination**
Central and South Norfolk League**
Great Yarmouth and District League
North East Norfolk League
North West Norfolk League 

Footnote: **Part of the English football league system.

Other Leagues
Norfolk Christian League
Norfolk and Suffolk Veterans League
Norfolk County FA Veterans League

Men's Sunday Leagues
Norwich and District Sunday League

Small Sided Leagues
County 5IVES
Mundial
Soccersixes.net
Champion Soccer

Youth Leagues
Mid Norfolk Youth League
Norfolk Christian Youth League
Norfolk and Suffolk Youth League

Ladies and Girls Leagues
Norfolk Women's and Girls' League

Disbanded or Amalgamated Leagues

A number of leagues that were affiliated to the Norfolk County FA have disbanded or amalgamated with other leagues including:

Aldred League (forerunner of the Great Yarmouth and District League)
Catton and District League (now part of the Central and South Norfolk League)
Comrades League (a league that operated in the Great Yarmouth area during the latter part of World War I)
Dereham and District League (now part of the Central and South Norfolk League)
East Anglian League (amalgamated with the Norfolk and Suffolk League in 1964 to become the Anglian Combination)
Great Yarmouth Borough League
Norfolk and Suffolk League (amalgamated with the East Anglian League in 1964 to become the Anglian Combination)
Norfolk Youth Football Combination League (amalgamated with the North East Norfolk Youth League and South Norfolk Youth League to become the Norfolk Combined Youth Football League)
North East Norfolk Youth League (amalgamated with the South Norfolk Youth League and Norfolk Youth Football Combination League to become the Norfolk Combined Youth Football League)
Norwich and District Saturday League (now part of the Central and South Norfolk League)
Norwich and South Norfolk District League (now part of the Central and South Norfolk League)
South Norfolk League
South Norfolk Youth League (amalgamated with the North East Norfolk Youth League and Norfolk Youth Football Combination League to become the Norfolk Combined Youth Football League)
Thetford and District Sunday Football League (now known as the Breckland and District Sunday Football League)
Thetford and District Youth League
Waveney Youth League

Affiliated Member Clubs

Among the notable clubs that are (or were at one time) affiliated to the Norfolk County FA are:

Cromer Town
Dereham Town
Diss Town
Downham Town
Fakenham Town

Great Yarmouth Town
Gorleston
Gothic (now defunct)
King's Lynn (now defunct)
King's Lynn Town

Norwich CEYMS
Norwich City
Norwich United
Sheringham

Swaffham Town
Thetford Town
Watton United
Wroxham
Wymondham Town

County Cup Competitions

The Norfolk County FA run the following Cup Competitions:

Norfolk Senior Cup
Norfolk Junior Cup
Norfolk Primary Cup
Norfolk Sunday Senior Cup

Norfolk Sunday Intermediate Cup
Norfolk Sunday Junior Cup
John Savage Cup

Stuary Dracup Cup
Norfolk Veterans Cup
Norfolk Women's Cup

Source

List of recent Norfolk County Cup Winners

Sources

Directors & Officials

Board of Directors
Michael Banham (Chairman)
Stacey Annison
Paul Ballard
Paul Marshall
John Turner
Joe Conway
Matt Wells
Matt Carpenter (Chief Executive)

Key Officials
Matt Carpenter (Chief Executive)
Matt Lemmon (Head of Football Services)
Ian Grange   (Head of Facilities & Development)
Rebecca Burton (Head of Marketing)
Lynnette Bygrave (Head of Finance)

References

External links

 

County football associations
Football in Norfolk
Sports organizations established in 1881
1881 establishments in England